Spitz Ridge is a prominent, mainly ice-covered ridge east of Cox Bluff, forming the east end of Toney Mountain, in Marie Byrd Land. Mapped by United States Geological Survey (USGS) from ground surveys and U.S. Navy air photos, 1959–66. Named by Advisory Committee on Antarctic Names (US-ACAN) for A. Lawrence (Larry) Spitz, ionospheric physicist, who wintered at Byrd Station in 1966 and worked additional summer seasons at Byrd and Hallett Station.

See also
Gillett Nunataks
Nicholson Rock

Ridges of Marie Byrd Land